Blackfriars Bridge (AKA: Traffic on Blackfriars Bridge) is an 1896 British short black-and-white  silent actuality film, directed by Robert W. Paul, featuring top-hatted pedestrians and horse-drawn carriages passing over Blackfriars Bridge, London. The film was, according to Michael Brooke of BFI Screenonline, "taken from the southern end looking northwards over the Thames by R.W. Paul in July 1896," and, "screened as part of his Alhambra Theatre programme shortly afterwards, certainly no later than 31 August"

References

External links
 
 

1896 films
British black-and-white films
British silent short films
British short documentary films
1890s short documentary films
Films directed by Robert W. Paul